The 1973 All-Ireland Football Championship was the 87th staging of the All-Ireland Senior Football Championship, the Gaelic Athletic Association's premier inter-county Gaelic football tournament. The championship began on 13 May 1973 and ended on 23 September 1973.

Offaly were the defending champions but were defeated by Galway in the All-Ireland semi-final.

On 23 September 1973, Cork won the championship following a 3-17 to 2-13 defeat of Galway in the All-Ireland final. This was their 4th All-Ireland title, their first in 28 championship seasons.

Offaly's Tony McTague was the championship's top scorer with 1-25. Cork's Billy Morgan was the choice for Texaco Footballer of the Year.

Results

Connacht Senior Football Championship

Quarter-final

Semi-finals

Final

Leinster Senior Football Championship

First round

Second round

Quarter-finals

 

Semi-finals

 

Final

Munster Senior Football Championship

Quarter-finals

 

Semi-finals

Final

Ulster Senior Football Championship

Preliminary round

Quarter-finals

 

Semi-finals

Final

All-Ireland Senior Football Championship

Semi-finals

Final

Championship statistics

Miscellaneous

 Tyrone won their first Ulster title since 1957.
 Offaly win the Leinster title for the third year in succession. It is the first time in their history that they claim the coveted "three-in-a-row". It is the first time since Laois in 1938 that a team claimed three successive Leinster titles.
 The All Ireland semi-final between Cork and Tyrone was the first championship meeting between the teams.
 Cork end their second longest drought without the All Ireland title of 28 years.

Top scorers

Overall

Single game

References

All-Ireland Senior Football Championship